is a Japanese former football player.

Playing career
Sato was born in Matsudo on July 19, 1978. After graduating from high school, he joined Japan Football League club Tokyo Gas (later FC Tokyo) in 1998. The club was promoted to new league J2 League from 1999. However he could hardly play in the match and left the club end of 1999 season. After 1 year blank, he joined Prefectural Leagues club Okinawa Kariyushi FC in 2001. The club was promoted to Regional Leagues from 2002. In 2003, he moved to Prefectural Leagues club FC Ryukyu. The club was promoted to Regional Leagues from 2005. In 2006, he moved to J2 club Tokyo Verdy. In 2007, he moved to FC Ryukyu again. He retired end of 2007 season.

Club statistics

References

External links

1978 births
Living people
Association football people from Chiba Prefecture
Japanese footballers
J2 League players
Japan Football League (1992–1998) players
Japan Football League players
FC Tokyo players
FC Ryukyu players
Tokyo Verdy players
Association football midfielders